) is a concrete gravity arch dam on the Naruse River in the town of Taiwa, Kurokawa District  Miyagi Prefecture, Japan, completed in 1987 by Kumagai. The dam supports a 220 KW hydroelectric power station.

Design
Minamikawa Dam is a hollow-core concrete gravity dam intended for flood control, irrigation water and hydroelectric power. The dam is accompanied by a 19.6 meter high saddle dam to increase its water level.

References 

Dams in Miyagi Prefecture
Dams completed in 1987
Taiwa, Miyagi
Gravity dams